Mónica Ramírez Almadani (born 1979) is an American lawyer who is CEO of Public Counsel, the largest pro bono law firm in the United States. She is a nominee to serve as a United States district judge of the United States District Court for the Central District of California.

Early life and education 
Mónica Ramírez Almadani was raised in Huntington Park, California by parents who were immigrants from Mexico. She was the first person in her family to go to college. She received a Bachelor of Arts in literature from Harvard University in 2001 and a juris doctor from Stanford Law School in 2004.

Career 

In 2004 and 2005, Ramírez served as a law clerk for Judge Warren J. Ferguson of the United States Court of Appeals for the Ninth Circuit. From 2005 to 2009, she worked as staff attorney at the ACLU Immigrants' Rights Project in San Francisco. 

In 2009, Ramírez joined the United States Department of Justice, serving as counsel to then-Assistant Secretary Tom Perez. She later served as senior counsel and deputy chief of staff for Deputy Attorney General James M. Cole. 

From 2012 to 2015, she served as an assistant United States attorney for the Central District of California. From 2015 to 2017, Ramírez served as special assistant attorney general in the California Department of Justice and Senior Advisor to then-California Attorney General Kamala Harris. From 2017, she worked as special counsel at Covington & Burling in their San Francisco office. Ramírez was a visiting professor of law at the University of California, Irvine School of Law from 2019 to 2021. 

In 2021, Ramírez became president of the nonprofit Public Counsel, the largest pro bono public interest law firm in the nation.

Notable cases as lawyer 

In 2017, Ramírez represented Juan Manuel Montes, a then 23 year old illegal immigrant who was deported to Mexico despite being granted relief from deportation under the Deferred Action for Childhood Arrivals program or DACA. 

In 2018, Ramírez represented the California state legislature as amicus curiae in a Chicago suit challenging Attorney General Jeff Sessions’ conditioning of grants to the end of sanctuary city policies. 

In 2020, Ramírez represented Kelvin Hernandez Roman, who sued the Orange County Sheriff’s Department for failing to comply with California sanctuary laws.

Nomination to the district court 

On December 21, 2022, President Joe Biden announced his intent to nominate Ramírez to serve as a United States district judge of the United States District Court for the Central District of California. On January 23, 2023, her nomination was sent to the Senate. President Biden nominated her to the seat vacated by Judge John Kronstadt, who assumed senior status on April 1, 2022. Her nomination is pending before the Senate Judiciary Committee. On February 15, 2023, a hearing on her nomination was held before the Senate Judiciary Committee.

References 

Living people
California lawyers
Harvard University alumni
People associated with Covington & Burling
People from Huntington Park, California
Stanford Law School alumni
United States Department of Justice officials
United States Department of Justice lawyers
University of California, Irvine faculty
Year of birth missing (living people)